Za Kalvarijo is a settlement north of Kalvarija Hill in the City Municipality of Maribor in northeastern Slovenia.

References

External links
Za Kalvarijo on Geopedia

Populated places in the City Municipality of Maribor